Christmas in France is a major annual celebration, as in most countries of the Christian world. Christmas is celebrated as a public holiday in France on December 25, concurring alongside other countries.

Public life on Christmas Day is generally quiet. Post offices, banks, stores, restaurants, cafés and other businesses are closed. Many people in France put up a Christmas tree, visit a special church service, eat an elaborate meal and open gifts on Christmas Eve. Other activities include walking in the park, participating in city life and sharing a meal with family and close friends.

Père Noël

Père Noël, "Father Christmas", sometimes called Papa Noël ("Father Christmas"), is a legendary gift-bringer at Christmas in France and other French-speaking areas, identified with the Father Christmas or Santa Claus of English-speaking territories. According to tradition, on Christmas Eve children leave their shoes by the fireplace filled with carrots and treats for Père Noël's donkey, Gui (French for "Mistletoe") before they go to bed. Père Noël takes the offerings and, if the child has been good, leaves presents in their place. Presents are traditionally small enough to fit in the shoes; candy, money, or small toys.

Music

Carols

Food

Some typical French Christmas foods include:
 Truffles
 Rabbit terrine
 Roasted capon
 Garlic soup
 Salad, peas, green beans, carrots and potatoes
 Small chocolate and sweet candies
Traditional French Christmas food includes a lot of meats (Ham, Turkey, Chicken and Beef) with sides like mashed potatoes, beans, salad, peas and carrots. Soup and bread is also very popular. Desserts include Yule log cake, cupcakes, muffins and other cakes along with small sweet and chocolate candies.

Decoration and decore

Decorating for Christmas is very common in France. Many households, public spaces, and businesses are decorated with lights and Christmas trees. Advent wreaths (Couronnes de l'Avent) are also common, they are made up of fir and pine tree branches for the first Sunday of Advent. The Advent wreath is topped by four candles, symbolizing the four Sundays leading up to Christmas. Each candle is lit on each of the Sundays before Christmas.

Trees can either be decorated or can have a simple homely and traditional décor. Instead of putting up ornamental Christmas decorations on the trees, often red ribbons are used for decorating the trees. Glass or plastic ornaments that resemble the apples that were traditionally hung from Christmas trees in France are also used for decorating the trees. Small white candles are also used. The use of the mistletoe considered to bring good luck and every household in France hangs mistletoe on the doors during Christmas. It is kept till New Year and there is a belief that if you kiss it at midnight, luck will favor you and you'll be filled with happiness and prosperity in the coming year.

Some other popular decorations include shoes instead of stockings, the use of candles are very popular and are typically set on tables during Christmas meals or set on window sills. Many French households, especially Christian ones, have nativity scenes. Also known as the crèche, it is kept in the living room and can be elaborate or simple, depending on individual preference.

See also

 Christmas traditions

Notes

External links

 
French culture
Public holidays in France